The DFB-Pokal 2012–13 was the 33rd season of the cup competition, Germany's second-most important title in women's football.

Participating clubs
The following teams qualified for the DFB-Pokal:

Results

Round 1
The draw for the first round was held on 13 July 2012. The eight best clubs of the previous Bundesliga season were awarded byes for the first round.

Round 2
The draw for the second round was held on 11 September 2012.  The match between Bayern Munich and Frankfurt is a repeat of the 2011−12 championship game.

Round of 16
The draw for the round of 16 was held on 14 October 2012.  The matches will be played on 17 and 18 November 2012.

Quarterfinals
The draw for the quarterfinals was held on 29 November 2012. The matches were played on 15 and 16 December 2012. One match was delayed due to bad weather.

Semifinals
The draw for the semifinals was held on 19 December 2012.

Final
The final was played on 19 May 2013.

Top goalscorers

References

Women
Pok
2012-13